Pidorus is a genus of moths belonging to the family Zygaenidae.

The species of this genus are found in Southeastern Asia.

Species
Species:

Pidorus albifascia 
Pidorus atratus 
Pidorus bifasciata 
Pidorus chalybeatus 
Pidorus circe 
Pidorus constrictus 
Pidorus corculum 
Pidorus cyrtus 
Pidorus euchromioides 
Pidorus gemina 
Pidorus glaucopis 
Pidorus hilaris 
Pidorus latifasciata 
Pidorus leechi 
Pidorus leno 
Pidorus miles 
Pidorus ochrolophus 
Pidorus splendens 
Pidorus truncatus

References

Zygaenidae
Zygaenidae genera